Malcolm Stuart Bell (born December 1981) is a British businessman, best known as co-founder of Zaggora, a sportswear company valued at £100M according to the Evening Standard. He has received several awards including the Orange National Business Awards in 2012. He has been a speaker at various events including TED (conference), Barclays, Facebook, Saïd Business School and Retail Week. He also mentors aspiring entrepreneurs through the New Entrepreneurs Foundation and Seedcamp.

Early life
Malcolm Stuart Bell was born in December 1981, the son of British politician Sir Stuart Bell.

Career
Bell began working as a website designer for local companies at age 15. In 2005, he graduated from the London School of Economics, and started working in investment management.

In 2011 he co-founded Zaggora alongside his wife, entrepreneur Dessi Bell.

Bell left Zaggora in 2013, and in 2014 he founded Mailcloud, a cloud tech business that raised 2.8m in committed capital from Octopus Holdings Limited, Bessemer Venture Partners, Kima Ventures, and Seedcamp. Bell has spoken at events for Google, Facebook, Barclays, TED, the Harvard Business School, and others. He mentors portfolio companies at Seedcamp.

Controversy
Malcom Bell appeared in ToryBoy The Movie where he was filmed arguing with and assaulting John Walsh. 

In 2002, Malcolm Bell was jailed for stealing £8,000 from  his father's colleagues. Malcolm Bell, the son of Stuart Bell, the MP for Middlesbrough, took blank cheques from the office of George Galloway while working for his father as a researcher in the House of Commons.

Elaine Sims, appearing for the prosecution, told the court that Bell went to work as usual on 31 August last year (2001) at Portcullis House, opposite the Houses of Parliament. But when he went into a neighbouring office of Geraldine Clerck, Mr Galloway's secretary, he took four cheques belonging to Finjan, a company associated with Mr Galloway at the time the MP for Glasgow Kelvin.

On the same day Bell made out one of the cheques for £350 to himself and paid it into a branch of HSBC bank. He then bought an Egyptian figurine over the internet for £1,788 using the name of Dr Mustafa. The teenager wrote out another of the stolen cheques and arranged for the statue to be delivered to his office in Westminster.

On 8 October he made out a further cheque payable to himself, for a sum of £500, but the bank returned it unpaid. He made a mistake in completing the fourth cheque and threw it away.

Police alerted to the theft searched Bell's home in Richmond upon Thames and found the Egyptian figurine on his mantelpiece. Bell admitted theft, obtaining property by deception, obtaining a money transfer by deception and attempting to obtain a money transfer by deception.

Bell also stole nearly £4,000 from Alan Whitehead MP, and computer equipment worth over £2,000 from Nigel Jones MP,  Oona King MP and Ann Winterton MP while he was working in Portcullis House, near the Houses of Parliament. He subsequently sold the computer equipment through an internet auction site and deposited the proceeds into his bank account.

He was jailed for 60 days.

References

External links
Official website

1981 births
Living people
21st-century British businesspeople